Bible II is the twelfth compilation album by Japanese singer Seiko Matsuda. The songs on the album were selected by Seiko herself.

Chart performance
Bible II debuted at number fourteen at the Oricon Album Weekly Chart.

Track listing

References

Seiko Matsuda albums
1994 greatest hits albums
J-pop albums